Marguerite de Montchevreuil (1633–1699), was a French courtier. 

She was born to Charles Boucher d'Orsay, seigneur d'Orsay and Marguerite Bourlon and married Henri de Mornay, markis de Montchevreuil (1623–1706) in 1653. 

In 1679, she was appointed to the Household of the new Dauphine Maria Anna Victoria of Bavaria: she was appointed to the post of governess of the Dauphines maids-of-honour, serving under the Première dame d'honneur Anne de Richelieu and the Dame d'atour Madeleine de Laval-Bois-Dauphin.   

She was a friend and confidante of Madame de Maintenon, and had some influence at court. She was described as pious and unattractive. 

Elizabeth Charlotte, Madame Palatine claimed in her letters that Madame de Maintenon did not wish the Dauphine to play any great role at court, slandered her against the king and bribed Barbara Bessola to isolate her. Elizabeth Charlotte claimed that Marguerite de Montchevreuil had been engaged by Maintenon to estrange the Dauphine and her spouse, quote: 
"That lady had also another creature in the Dauphine's household: this was Madame de Montchevreuil, the gouvernante of the Dauphine's filles d’honneur. Madame de Maintenon had engaged her to place the Dauphin upon good terms with the filles d’honneur, and she finished by estranging him altogether from his wife. During her pregnancy, which, as well as her lying-in, was extremely painful, the Dauphine could not go out; and this Montchevreuil took advantage of the opportunity thus afforded her to introduce the filles d’honneur to the Dauphin to hunt and game with him. He became fond, in his way, of the sister of La Force, who was afterwards compelled to marry young Du Roure. [...] The Dauphin had an affair of gallantry with another of his wife's filles d’honneur called Rambures. He did not affect any dissimulation with his wife; a great uproar ensued; and that wicked Bessola, following the directions of old Maintenon, who planned everything, detached the Dauphin from his wife more and more. The latter was not very fond of him; but what displeased her in his amours was that they exposed her to be openly and constantly ridiculed and insulted. Montchevreuil made her pay attention to all that passed, and Bessola kept up her anger against her husband." 
Elizabeth Charlotte also claimed that the Dauphin did not mourn his spouse when she died, "old Montchevreuil had told him so many lies of his wife that he could not love her."

References

1633 births
1699 deaths
French ladies-in-waiting
Court of Louis XIV